The 2000 Mountain West Conference football season was the second since eight former members of the Western Athletic Conference banded together to form the Mountain West Conference. Colorado State won the conference championship in 2000, making the Rams the first to win an outright league title after the three-way tie in 1999.

Coaching changes
Vic Koenning took over at Wyoming, replacing Dana Dimel.

Bowl games

Awards
Co-Coaches of the Year: Sonny Lubick, Colorado State and John Robinson, UNLV
Co-Offensive Players of the Year: QB Matt Newton, Sr, Colorado State and QB Matt Thiessen, Sr, Air Force
Defensive Player of the Year: LB Rick Crowell, Sr, Colorado State
Co-Freshmen of the Year: DL Jason Kaufusi, Utah and DB Brandon Ratcliff, New Mexico

All Conference Team